Nelson Bass (1894–1963) was a New Zealand rugby league player who represented New Zealand in four test matches between 1919 and 1921.

Playing career
Bass played for the Newton Rangers club in the Auckland Rugby League competition for 4 seasons (1919–1922) before transferring to the Marist Old Boys in 1923. He again transferred at the conclusion of the 1923 season, this time to the City Rovers. Bass played in four test matches for New Zealand between 1919 and 1921, against Australia and Great Britain.

Bass also represented Auckland, including in losses to Australia and New South Wales and a 24-16 win over Great Britain in 1920. In 1925 he captained Auckland City in an 11-24 loss to Great Britain.

In a 3rd round match for City Rovers in the first grade competition against Ponsonby United in 1927 Bass tore his knee cartilage which forced his early retirement.

References

1894 births
1963 deaths
Auckland rugby league team players
City Rovers players
Marist Saints players
New Zealand national rugby league team players
New Zealand rugby league players
Newton Rangers players
Rugby league locks
Rugby league players from Nelson, New Zealand